Third grade (also called grade three, equivalent to Year 4 in England) is a year of primary education in many countries. It is the third school year of primary school. Students are usually 8–9 years old.

Examples of the American syllabus 
In mathematics, students are usually sometimes generally introduced to multiplication and division facts, place value to thousands or ten thousands, and estimation. Depending on the elementary school, third grade students may even begin to work on long division, such as dividings in the double digits, hundreds, and thousands. Decimals (to tenths only) are sometimes generally introduced. Students begin to work on problem-solving skills working to explain their thinking in mathematical terms.
In science, third grade students are taught basic physics and chemistry.  Weather and climate are also sometimes taught.  The concept of atoms and molecules are common, the states of matter, and energy, along with basic chemical elements such as oxygen, hydrogen, gold, zinc, and iron.  Nutrition is also sometimes taught in third grade along with chemistry.
Social studies begins a study of the culture of the United States and basic idea of the early part of the United States from the time of the Native Americans to the Civil War. Outward expansion and the gold rush are covered.
In reading and language arts, third grade students begin working more on text comprehension by using informational articles or different genre books than decoding strategies. Students also begin reading harder chapter books. They read and distinguish between a variety of book genres: realistic fiction, non-fiction, poetry, fantasy, historical fiction, science fiction and folktales. Kids learn reading, vocabulary, and writing strategies such as finding main idea, finding theme, citing textual evidence , compare and contrast, nouns, verbs, context clues, writing narratives, writing research reports, writing explanatory essays, and writing persuasive and argumentative pieces.

Grade 3 students learn how to work on projects on their own and with others. This may start as early as second grade and first grade as well. Social skills, empathy and leadership are considered by some educators to be as important to develop as the academic skills of reading, writing and arithmetic.

Australian equivalent

In Australia, this level of class is called Year 3. Children generally start this level between the ages of eight and nine.

Brazilian equivalent 

In Brazil, third grade is the terceiro ano do Ensino Fundamental I, in this case, children begin their first year of elementary school at age 6 or 7 depending on their birthdate. Therefore, the 3rd year of elementary school is typically for students of 8 (96 months)–9 years (108 months) of age. All children students must be 8 years old before the cut-off date.

British equivalent

In England, the year of school that is the same age as 3rd Grade is Year 4, which is the fourth year of compulsory education. Most children start one year earlier however, in the Reception class. Welsh pupils are in their fourth full year of compulsory education. 
In Northern Ireland and Scottish pupils are in "Primary 4", their fourth year of compulsory education.

Canadian equivalent

In Canada, the year is called Grade 3, and the pupils are known as "3rd grade".

French equivalent

In France, children aged 8 join CE2 ("Cours élémentaire deuxième année"), the third school year of primary school. It was formerly called "neuvième" (ninth year before Terminale, the "baccalauréat" year).

German equivalent
In Germany, the equivalent grade is 3. Klasse.

Greece equivalent

In Greece, the third school year of primary school is referred to as Third Grade of Primary (Triti - Τρίτη Δημοτικού)..

Indian equivalent

In India children enter Class 3 or 4 at ages 8 to 9.

Irish equivalent

In the Republic of Ireland, the equivalent is Third Class or Rang a trí (for 9-10 year olds) which is the fifth year of Primary School.

New Zealand equivalent

In New Zealand, this level of class is called Standard 2 or Year 4. Children generally start this level between the ages of eight and nine.

Portuguese equivalent

In Portugal, the third grade (terceiro ano, 3.º ano) is the third year of the four-year 1.º Ciclo do Ensino Básico that includes also the first grade, the second grade and the fourth grade.

Spanish equivalent

In Spain for children from 8 to 9 years old is also the third year of elementary education (tercero de EGB, tercero de primaria). Also, elementary education is further subdivided into two stages. This is the third year in the first stage or primaria in Spanish.

References 

3
Primary education